Budae-jjigae or spicy sausage stew is a type of Korean jjigae (stew), made with ham, sausage, Spam, baked beans, kimchi, instant noodles, and gochujang. The dish was created shortly after the Korean War using surplus processed and canned foods from United States Forces Korea bases in South Korea. Although the dish was born in the period of post-war impoverishment, it continued to be popular during the period of rapid growth, and is still popular today. There are many restaurants specializing in budae-jjigae, with the most famous ones on the budae-jjigae street in Uijeongbu, where the dish was allegedly first made. The dish is now a popular anju (accompaniment to alcoholic drinks) and a comfort food cooked in a large pot for multiple people.

Etymology 
Budae is a military unit, often a troop.  As a troop's camp is also called budae, the word gun budae ("military camp") is often used to refer to military camps in general, with migun budae ("U.S. military camp") referring to U.S. military bases. Jjigae, often translated as "stew", means a soup thicker than guk (soup).

History 

After the Korean War, food was scarce in South Korea. People dwelling around U.S. military bases in the Uijeongbu, Pyeongtaek, and Munsan regions made use of leftover or excess food from those bases. These were generally either scraps stolen from the bases or excess leftovers sold by American soldiers through a black market (as Koreans could not legally access American products). These foods were usually processed meat products, collectively known as budae-gogi ("army base meat"), often including ham, hot dogs, Spam, and canned baked beans.

It is said that budae-jjigae began as a buttery stir-fried meal made of canned pineapples, cabbages, onions, American cheese, and mystery meat, called ggulgguri-juk (꿀꿀이죽; "piggy porridge"); many of these ingredients are still added to budae-jjigae today. Over time, anchovy broth (flavored with gochujang and kimchi) began to be used as the base, resulting in the modern budae-jjigae.

Budae-jjigae is still popular in South Korea. Common ingredients now include baked beans, Vienna sausage, bacon, tofu, pork, ground beef, mandu, instant noodles, macaroni, tteok (rice cake), American cheese, mozzarella, minari, scallions, chili peppers, garlic, mushrooms, and other in-season vegetables. The city of Uijeongbu, which is bordered by Seoul to the south and has many army bases, is particularly famous for its budae-jjigae. In the late 20th century, the city of Uijeongbu stipulated that the dish be referred to as Uijeongbu-jjigae to remove the military or wartime connotation in the name, though not many restaurants follow this guideline. Some restaurants have begun calling their product Uijeongbu-budae-jjigae. There is also what locals refer to as "Uijeongbu Budae-jjigae Street", home to a high concentration of budae-jjigae restaurants.

U.S. President connection 
A form of budae-jjigae developed in Yongsan-gu, Seoul is called Johnsontang ("Johnson soup"). It is named after U.S. President Lyndon B. Johnson, who is said to have enjoyed the dish during his 1966 visit to South Korea. It was also purportedly served to Jimmy Carter during his visit in 1979, resulting in its less-common alternate name Cartertang. The restaurant Johnson allegedly ate the dish at, Bada Sikdang, still serves Johnsontang as its signature dish.

See also 
Fusion cuisine
List of ham dishes
List of legume dishes

References 

Korean cuisine
Korean words and phrases
American fusion cuisine
Legume dishes
Ham dishes
Korean fusion cuisine
Korean soups and stews
Sausage dishes
Table-cooked dishes
Culture in Gyeonggi Province